Kermit may refer to:

Kermit the Frog, The Muppets character
Kermit Roosevelt (disambiguation), any of several descendants of U. S. President Theodore Roosevelt
Kermit (given name)
Kermit, the stage name for Paul Leveridge of Black Grape 
Kermit (protocol), for computer file transfers
Kermit, Texas
Kermit, West Virginia
Kermit (band), an instrumental rock quartet